El Madroño is a municipality located in the province of Seville, Spain. According to the 2005 census (INE), the town has a population of 367 inhabitants.

References

External links
El Madroño - Sistema de Información Multiterritorial de Andalucía

Municipalities of the Province of Seville